Shannon O'Brien is an American educator and politician serving as a member of the Montana Senate from the 46th district. Elected in November 2020, she assumed office on January 4, 2021.

Early life and education 
O'Brien was born in Portland, Oregon. Raised on Orcas Island, Washington, she graduated from Orcas Island High School. She earned a Bachelor of Arts degree in political science from the University of Washington in 1991, a Master of Education from Gonzaga University, and an EdD from the University of Montana.

Career 
From 1994 to 1998, O'Brien was a history teacher at Stanwood High School in Stanwood, Washington. She was later an administrator at the Early College for Native Youth. From 2013 to 2015, she was an education policy advisor for Governor Steve Bullock. She was the dean of the Missoula College–University of Montana from 2015 to 2017. O'Brien was elected to the Montana Senate in November 2020 and assumed office on January 4, 2021.

References 

Living people
Politicians from Portland, Oregon
University of Washington alumni
Gonzaga University alumni
University of Montana alumni
University of Montana faculty
Democratic Party Montana state senators
Year of birth missing (living people)